Halmurad Sahatmuradov (1898–1938) served as the second president of the Turkmen SSR, serving from 1925 until August 1928. He is sometimes mistaken for a first secretary of the Turkmen SSR, when in reality the first secretaries at the time were:

Ivan Mezhlauk to 1926
Shaymardan Ibragimov 1926-1927
Nikolay Paskutsky 1927-1928

References 
World Statesmen

Communist Party of Turkmenistan politicians
1898 births
1938 deaths